Danuta Szaflarska (6 February 1915 – 19 February 2017) was a Polish film and stage actress. In 2008 she was awarded the Złota Kaczka for the best Polish actress of the century. Szaflarska participated in the Warsaw Uprising as a liaison. Szaflarska was awarded the Order of Polonia Restituta, Commander's Cross and Commander's Cross with Star, one of Poland's highest Orders and Gold Medal of Gloria Artis (2007).

Personal life 
Szaflarska was born in Kosarzyska, Piwniczna-Zdrój (Galicia, Austria-Hungary, now Poland). She married her first husband, Jan Ekier, a pianist, in 1942. They had one daughter, Maria. The pair divorced. Her second husband, Janusz Kilański, was a radio announcer. He was the father of Szaflarska's second daughter, Agnieszka. Kilański and Szaflarska also divorced. Szaflarska turned 100 in February 2015. She was a regular player of Teatr Rozmaitości in Warsaw, specializing in modern and progressive drama, and in her later years appeared in four different plays at the theatre.

Filmography 

 1946: Dwie godziny
 1946: Zakazane piosenki
 1948: Skarb
 1951: Warsaw Premiere
 1953: Domek z kart
 1956: Zemsta
 1961: Dziś w nocy umrze miasto
 1961: Ludzie z pociągu
 1962: The Impossible Goodbye
 1962: Głos z tamtego świata
 1967: To jest twój nowy syn
 1971: Pan Samochodzik i templariusze (TV series)
 1977: Lalka (TV series)
 1978: Umarli rzucają cień
 1978: Wsteczny bieg
 1980: The Green Bird
 1982: Valley of the Issa
 1984: 5 dni z życia emeryta
 1986: Pokój dziecinny
 1989: Babisia
 1990: Korczak
 1991: Diabły, diabły
 1991: Skarga
 1993: Pajęczarki
 1993: Pożegnanie z Marią
 1994: Faustyna
 1995: Świt na opak
 1996: Spóźniona podróż
 1997: Księga wielkich życzeń
 1998: Nic
 1998: Siedlisko (TV series)
 1999: Alchemik i dziewica
 1999: Egzekutor
 1999: Palce lizać (TV series)
 1999: The Junction
 1999: Tydzień z życia mężczyzny
 2000: Nieznana opowieść wigilijna
 2000: Żółty szalik
 2001: Listy miłosne
 2001: The Spring to Come
 2002: The Spring to Come (TV series)
 2003: Królowa chmur
 2004: Czwarta władza
 2007: Ranczo Wilkowyje
 2007: Pora umierać
 2008: How Much Does the Trojan Horse Weigh?
 2008: Before Twilight
 2009: Ostatnia akcja
 2009: Janosik. Prawdziwa historia
 2010: Mała matura 1947
 2012: Aftermath (Polish film)
 2014: Między nami dobrze jest
 2015: Mom and Other Loonies in the Family

Polish dubbing 

 1949: Spotkanie nad Łabą .... Janet Sherwood
 1950: Rada bogów
 1951: Śmiech w raju
 1955: Czarna teczka .... Yvonne
 1955: Pamiętnik majora Thompsona
 1955: Lady and the Tramp
 1956: Marynarzu, strzeż się
 1962: Próba terroru
 1962: Wspaniały Red
 1962: Trzy plus dwa
 1962: Julio, jesteś czarująca .... Julia
 1963: Miecz i waga
 1967: Kobiety nie bij nawet kwiatem
 1968: Nie do obrony
 1970: Zerwanie
 1970: Trup w każdej szafie .... Sabrina
 1971: Elizabeth R .... Kat Ashley
 1991: Hook .... Wendy Darling
 1994: Country Life .... Moud
 2006: Karol: The Pope, The Man .... Mother Teresa
 2007: Enchanted .... Narrator

See also
 List of centenarians (actors, filmmakers and entertainers)

References

External links 

Danuta Szaflarska at the Filmpolski.pl (in Polish).

1915 births
2017 deaths
People from Nowy Sącz County
People from the Kingdom of Galicia and Lodomeria
Polish Austro-Hungarians
Polish actresses
Warsaw Uprising insurgents
Knights of the Order of Polonia Restituta
Commanders of the Order of Polonia Restituta
Commanders with Star of the Order of Polonia Restituta
20th-century Polish actresses
Recipients of the Gold Medal for Merit to Culture – Gloria Artis
Polish film actresses
Polish stage actresses
Polish centenarians
Women centenarians
Women in World War II
Recipient of the Meritorious Activist of Culture badge